Northwestern Regional School District No. 7 (NWR7) is a school district headquartered in Winsted, Connecticut.

Its service area includes Barkhamsted, Colebrook, New Hartford, and Norfolk. Its service area does not include Winsted.

Within the total student body New Hartford residents comprise, in a given year, around 48% to 51%.

It operates two schools:
 Northwestern Regional High School
 Northwestern Regional Middle School

In 2010 the district selected Judith A. Palmer as the superintendent. Her salary increased in 2021.

References

External links
 Northwestern Regional School District No. 7
 Index of articles - Republican American
School districts in Connecticut
Education in Litchfield County, Connecticut